Sydney Lyric is a theatre in Sydney, New South Wales, Australia. It is part of The Star complex. The theatre is used for large scale musicals, theatre productions, concerts, opera and ballet. Formerly the Lyric Theatre, the venue changed to its current name in late 2011.

The theatre has been owned and operated by Foundation Theatres Pty Limited (formerly Foundation Entertainment Group) since October 2011, which also owns Sydney's Capitol Theatre.

In February 2017, the Sydney Lyric underwent a $18 million auditorium upgrade, including movable walls that alter the theatre's seating capacity from 1,350 up to 2,010 seats. These works completed the upgrade of the whole theatre, encompassing foyers, bars & box office which were completed in 2014.

Notable performances
The theatre was built as part of the casino complex initially known as Star City and now as The Star, and first opened in September 1997 with its first act being Michael Crawford and has since then played most to many well known musicals and entertainers.

Performances include:
 2023 - Hairspray, Wicked
 2022 - Mary Poppins, Cinderella 2021 - Hamilton 2020 - Shrek the Musical, War Horse, Pippin (musical) 2019 - Peter Pan Goes Wrong, Saturday Night Fever, Muriel's Wedding, Billy Elliot 
 2018 - The Book Of Mormon (2018-2019)
 2017 - The Bodyguard (musical), Beautiful: The Carole King Musical 2016 - We Will Rock You, Singin' in the Rain, Dream Lover (World Premiere)
 2015 - Matilda The Musical (Australian Premiere), The Rocky Horror Show, Le Noir - The Dark Side of Cirque, Thriller - Live 2014 - Strictly Ballroom (World Premiere), Dirty Dancing 2013 - War Horse, Hot Shoe Shuffle, Blue Man Group, Grease 2012 - Legally Blonde the Musical (Australian premiere). An Officer and a Gentleman (world premiere), Frankie Valli & the Four Seasons 2011 - Annie (2011–12), Richard III starring Kevin Spacey, Elton John Live, An Evening with Al Pacino, Stevie Wonder Live, Hairspray, Doctor Zhivago (world premiere), The Music of Andrew Lloyd Webber
 2010 - Cats, West Side Story 2009 - Mamma Mia, Chicago, Buddy 2008 - Priscilla Queen of the Desert (return), The Phantom of the Opera, Shout 2007 - Miss Saigon 2006 - Priscilla Queen of the Desert - the Musical (world premiere 2006-07), Dusty 2005 - The Producers 2004 - We Will Rock You (2004–05), Lisa Marie Presley, Cirque Dreams, Shanghai Circus, Sleeping Beauty on Ice, Saturday Night Fever 2003 - The Lion, the Witch & the Wardrobe 2002 - Mamma Mia, Oliver, Pirates of Penzance 2001 - The Wizard of Oz, Hale and Pace, Singing in the Rain, Michael Ball, Petula Clark
 2000 - Annie, Tony Bennett, Jerry Lewis, Al Jarreau, Peter Ustinov
 1999 - The Merry Widow, Geraldine Turner, Kamahl, Adam Brand, Popcorn, Tony Bennett, The Sound of Music 1998 - Julio Iglesias, An Ideal Husband, Show Boat''
 1997 - Michael Crawford, Natalie Cole, Peter Paul and Mary, Elisa Chan, Kenny Gee, K.D.Lang, Air Supply

Indicates current production
Indicates the production was cancelled due to indoor event restrictions as part of the Covid-19 outbreak

Local area

The Sydney Lyric theatre is located in The Star casino complex, which is in the suburb of Pyrmont, an inner-city suburb of Sydney in the state of New South Wales, Australia. Pyrmont is located 2 kilometres south-west of the Sydney central business district in the local government area of the City of Sydney. It is also part of the Darling Harbour district. Pyrmont was once a vital component of Sydney's industrial waterfront, with wharves, shipbuilding yards, factories and woolstores. As industry moved out, the population and the area declined. In recent years it has experienced redevelopment with an influx of residents and office workers.

References

External links

Theatres in Sydney
Theatres completed in 1997
Pyrmont, New South Wales